Sir Charles Edward Bernard  (21 December 1837 – 19 September 1901) was a British colonial administrator.

Biography

Charles Bernard was born in Bristol, England. He was the son of James Fogo Bernard, a medical physician and Marianne Amelia Lawrence, and was educated at Rugby School, Addiscombe, and Haileybury and Imperial Service College. In 1857 he passed into the ICS and was posted to the Punjab. From 1874 to 1877 he was Chief Commissioner of the Central Provinces. Three years later came the appointment as Chief Commissioner of Lower Burma from 2 July 1880 to 2 March 1883, followed by the appointment as Chief Commissioner of  Burma from 25 September 1886 to 12 March 1887.
From 1887 he was back in London as Secretary of the Department of Revenue, Statistics and Commerce, India Office.

In 1862 he married Susan Capel Tawney, and they had eight children.

He died on 19 September 1901 at Chamonix, France, after a short illness.

External links
 Myanmar (Burma) at www.worldstatesmen.org

References

"The Career of Sir Charles Edward Bernard in Myanmar" in U Hla Thein, Selected Writings (Yangon: Myanmar Historical Commission, 2004) 134-166
John Riddick, Who Was Who in British India

1837 births
1901 deaths
Administrators in British Burma
Knights Commander of the Order of the Star of India
Indian Civil Service (British India) officers
Civil servants in the India Office
Fellows of the Royal Scottish Geographical Society